Ilya Savelev (born 10 June 1971 in Moscow) is a Russian volleyball player who competed in the 2000 Summer Olympics.

In 2000 he was part of the Russian team which won the silver medal in the Olympic tournament. He played seven matches.

References

External links
 
 
 

1971 births
Living people
Russian men's volleyball players
Olympic volleyball players of Russia
Volleyball players at the 2000 Summer Olympics
Olympic silver medalists for Russia
Olympic medalists in volleyball
Sportspeople from Moscow
Medalists at the 2000 Summer Olympics
20th-century Russian people
21st-century Russian people